Harston is a surname. Notable people with the surname include:

 John Harston (1920–2013), English footballer
 Julian Harston (born 1942), United Nations official
 Ted Harston (1907–1971), English footballer

See also
 Hairston